Gove Township is a township in Gove County, Kansas, USA.  As of the 2000 census, its population was 215.

Geography
According to the USGS, it contains one cemetery, Gove.

The streams of Middle Branch Hackberry Creek, North Branch Hackberry Creek, South Branch Hackberry Creek and West Spring Creek run through this township.

References
 USGS Geographic Names Information System (GNIS)

External links
 US-Counties.com
 City-Data.com

Townships in Gove County, Kansas
Townships in Kansas